Cavaillon (Provençal: Cavalhon) is a commune in the Vaucluse department in the Provence-Alpes-Côte d'Azur region of Southeastern France. It is situated in the Durance Valley, at the foot of the Luberon mountains. In 2019, it had a population of 26,236.

History
Cavaillon was already a city in the Gallo-Roman period, and has several minor relics from that era, including a 1st century triumphal arch. Other minor relics of the Roman period have been found to the south of the town, on the site of the ancient Cabellio. It was the seat of the bishops of Cavaillon from the 4th century until the French Revolution. Saint Veran was bishop here in the 6th century, and the 12th-century cathedral is dedicated to him. In the Middle Ages Cavaillon was part of the Comtat Venaissin.

Geography
Cavaillon is part of the Regional and Natural Park of Luberon (parc naturel régional du Luberon) in the French Department of Vaucluse.

The Calavon, a tributary of the Durance locally called Coulon, flows westward through the middle of the commune.

The Durance forms the commune's south-western border.

Population

Economy
Cavaillon is famous for its Kiwi melons, as well as other early fruits and vegetables.

Famous people
 saint César de Bus
 Christophe Bioules (Professional Freestyle BMX rider)

Sights
 the 11th-13th century Cavaillon Cathedral
 Colline Saint-Jacques with chapel
 Roman triumphal arch

Twin towns
Cavaillon has been twinned with Weinheim, Germany, since 1958 and Langhirano, Italy, since 2001.

See also
Communes of the Vaucluse department
Antoine Sartorio
Ancient Diocese of Cavaillon

References

External links
 Town council website
 Tourism office website
 Melon of Cavaillon 

Communes of Vaucluse
Cavares
Vaucluse communes articles needing translation from French Wikipedia